Spring Creek Elementary School may refer to:
Spring Creek Elementary School - Rockford Public School District 205 - Rockford, Illinois
Spring Creek Elementary School - Elko County School District - Spring Creek, Nevada
Spring Creek Elementary School - Deer Creek School District - Oklahoma City, Oklahoma
Spring Creek Elementary School - Hamilton County Department of Education - Chattanooga, Tennessee
Spring Creek Elementary School - Garland Independent School District - Garland, Texas
Spring Creek Elementary School - Richardson Independent School District - Dallas, Texas
Spring Creek Elementary School - Albany County School District 1 - Laramie, Wyoming